Moravians ( or colloquially , outdated ) are a West Slavic ethnographic group from the Moravia region of the Czech Republic, who speak the Moravian dialects of Czech or Common Czech or a mixed form of both. Along with the Silesians of the Czech Republic, a part of the population to identify ethnically as Moravian has registered in Czech censuses since 1991. The figure has fluctuated and in the 2011 census, 6.01% of the Czech population declared Moravian as their ethnicity. Smaller pockets of people declaring Moravian ethnicity are also native to neighboring Slovakia.

Etymology

The adjective  and the noun  ('Bohemian') carry only the meaning of a "socially unconventional person".

History

Moravian tribe

The Moravians (Old Slavic self-designation ,) were a West Slavic tribe in the Early Middle Ages. Although it is not known exactly when the Moravian tribe was founded, Czech historian Dušan Třeštík claimed the tribe was formed between the turn of the 6th century to the 7th century, around the same time as the other Slavic tribes.

In the 9th century, Moravians settled mainly around the historic Region of Moravia and Western Slovakia, but also in parts of central-southern Poland, Lower Austria (up to the Danube) and Upper Hungary. The first known mention of the Moravians was in the Annales Regni Francorum in 822 AD. The tribe was located by the Bavarian Geographer between the tribe of the Bohemians and the tribe of the Bulgarians.

In the 9th century, Moravians gained control over neighbouring Nitra and founded the Realm of Great Moravia, ruled by the Mojmír dynasty until the 10th century. At times, the empire controlled even other neighboring regions, including Bohemia and parts of present-day Hungary, Poland and Ukraine. It emerged into one of the most powerful states in Central Europe.

After the breakup of the Moravian Realm, the Moravian tribe was divided between the new states of Bohemia and Hungary. Part of western Moravians were assimilated by the Czechs and presently identify as Czechs. The modern nation of the Slovaks was formed out of the eastern part of the Moravian tribe within the Kingdom of Hungary.

Moravians within the Czech lands

Bretislaus I, Duke of Bohemia, in solving the succession question in his will (he had five sons) decided to completely reorganize Moravia, so that it should be governed by the younger sons of the royal family. It was still considered one country, but from an objective standpoint it was weakened, and Moravia could not lead to the formation of the medieval "nation" as quickly as in Bohemia. The way leading to the differentiation of the Moravians from the Czechs was caused by political and economic changes of the late 12th and early 13th century. Czech historical tradition was grown in Moravia during the Middle Ages, for example Czech Chronicles was reread and distributed.

Until the beginning of the 20th century, the Slavic-speaking inhabitants of Moravia publicly identified themselves as Moravians, not Czechs. Then, for fear of Germanization, Moravians would begin to publicly refer to themselves as Moravian Czechs — joining a stronger neighbour. But internally they still felt their nationality (for example, here). Slovaks were considered as Czechs by politicians, too. In the Czechoslovak and communist eras, Moravian nationality would be banned, so for the first time since the fall of the dangers of germanization (1945), Moravian nationality appeared in the 1991 census.

After the Velvet Revolution a strong political movement to reinstate the Moravian-Silesian land ( in Czech, having been one of the four lands of Czechoslovakia between 1928 and 1939) was active in Moravia. Accordingly, the so far officially united Czech ethnicity was split in line with the historical division of the Czech Republic into Bohemia, Moravia and Czech Silesia (the Czech lands). Part of the Czech speaking inhabitants of Moravia declared Moravian ethnicity and part of the Czech speaking inhabitants of Czech Silesia declared Silesian ethnicity.

1,363,000 citizens of the Czech Republic declared Moravian ethnicity in 1991. However, the number dropped to 380,474 in the 2001 census – many persons previously declaring themselves as Moravians declared themselves again as Czechs in this census. In 2011, the number increased again to 630 897. The strongest sense of patriotism towards Moravia is found in the environs of Brno, the former capital of Moravia. However, the results of the census are skewed by the fact that most Moravians do not know that they can sign up for the Moravian nationality, but would use the option, according to a 2011 survey.

Only in the first years after the Velvet Revolution in 1989 did a few Moravian political parties seem to be able to gain some success in elections. However they lost much of their strength around the time of the dissolution of Czechoslovakia in 1993 when Czechoslovakia peacefully split into the Czech Republic and Slovak Republic.

According to the 2011 Census, the percentage of people without religion was lowest in the Moravian Zlín Region, followed by the partly Bohemian, partly Moravian Vysočina Region, the South Moravian Region, the Moravian-Silesian Region, and the predominantly Moravian Olomouc Region.

See also 
 List of Moravians
 Old Salem

References

Inline citations

Sources 

 
 
 
 
 
  

Ethnic groups in the Czech Republic
People from Moravia
History of Moravia
Slavic ethnic groups
West Slavs
Great Moravia